The Big Three or MBB refers to the name colloquially given to the three large strategy consulting firms. They are considered to be the most prestigious firms in the management consulting industry. In terms of employees, McKinsey & Company is the largest and leads by revenue; followed by Boston Consulting Group and Bain & Company.

The firms
The three consulting firms widely regarded as constituting the Big Three or MBB are McKinsey & Company, Bain & Company and Boston Consulting Group.

These three firms are among the world's largest strategy consulting firms by revenue. Their latest publicly available data is summarized in the table below:

McKinsey & Company
This firm was founded in Chicago by James O. McKinsey in 1926. The firm has grown significantly since then, establishing 104 offices located in 60 countries as of 2014. McKinsey & Company has been voted number one in "The Best Consulting Firms: Prestige" list of the Vault.com career intelligence website consecutively for 14 years since 2002. The firm currently serves two-thirds of the Fortune 1000. Their areas of expertise include management, organization, operations and IT.

Boston Consulting Group
BCG was founded in 1963 by Bruce D. Henderson, a former Arthur D. Little consultant and a Vanderbilt University and Harvard Business School alumnus. Starting out with only two consultants, the firm quickly grew. As of 2021, it employs 25,000 people in over 90 offices in more than 50 countries. BCG also has been consistently featured in Consulting magazine's "Best Firms to Work For" lists since 2001. Their areas of expertise include corporate development, business growth and innovation.

Bain & Company
Bain was founded by Bill Bain in 1973 after leaving BCG. The firm pioneered private equity consulting and the fund Bain Capital was founded by partners from Bain & Company and led by Mitt Romney. It currently has 65 offices in 40 countries. Their areas of expertise include private equity, mergers and acquisitions and retail. Bridgespan, a non-profit consultancy, was spun out of Bain in the early 2000s by three former Bain employees. The firm has been ranked multiple times as one of the "Best Places to Work" by Glassdoor, and has placed in the top five for the last decade.

See also
 Big Four accounting firms
 List of management consulting firms

References

International management consulting firms